The NSU/Fiat Weinsberg 500 (1960 Neckar Weinsberg 500 ) is a Fiat automobile. It was produced in two versions (Limousette and Coupé) based on the Fiat 500 (1957–1975). Like the Neckar Pully, the Weinsberg was the creation of NSU/FIAT Karosseriewerke Weinsberg, made possible because NSU/FIAT in Heilbronn also had its own development department, in which designers such as Antonio Fessia worked. Introduced in March 1959 as the NSU/Fiat, 6,228 vehicles were manufactured from 1959 to 1963. The price was 3,840 DM in 1959, 3620DM in 1962.

German modification 

Two Weinsberg versions were sold at 3,840 DM (including heater and sunroof, whitewall tires were an extra 50 DM) - the Coupe and the Limousette. They differ only in the rear window design: The coupé features a wraparound panoramic rear screen, allowing only enough headroom above the rear seat for small children (up to about 7 years old).

The Limousette has rear side windows and a steeper, conventional rear window like a small sedan, hence the name. This gives the Limousette a little more headroom than the coupe, but less than a Fiat 500 Nuova. Both Weinberg models are basically two-seaters with additional space for two children or luggage. Despite having an inviting padded rear seat, it is not practical for adults. The German tire used in the Weinsberg is 4.40x12” size rather than the 125 x 12 of the normal Fiat 500, indicating that the Weinsberg was regarded as a two-seater; the utmost load capacity was slightly less than the slightly wider 125 – 12.

In contrast to Autobianchi Bianchina, both Weinsberg versions were built from partially assembled car bodies with modifications to both front and rear panels. The front bonnet is higher, as is the wing profile, with finned rear wings and with rear lights that are unique to the Weinsberg. The cars benefited from some equipment upgrades in character with a luxury version: a sunroof instead of a folding roof, bug ornament, special bumpers, standard two-tone color and wheel covers, ashtray in the dashboard, better upholstery fabrics and wide pockets in the doors.

The luggage space is greater, made possible by the fact that the higher bonnet allows the spare wheel to be placed on the tank. The first version side trim was soon replaced by a contrasting colour side stripe.

The Weinsberg's driving performance and handling characteristics match the Fiat 500. Daily production peaked at 14 cars.

Other companies built cars based on the Nuova 500, under license, such as Steyr-Puch in Austria, Simca in France, Polski Fiat in Poland and  Autobianchi in Italy.

Technical characteristics 

All models have:

External links 

 NSU/Fiat Weinsberg 500 Register

References

1960s cars
City cars
Fiat vehicles
Cars introduced in 1959